Carlos López (born 27 August 1926) is a Spanish equestrian who competed in the 1956 Summer Olympics.

References

External links
 

1926 births
Living people
Spanish male equestrians
Olympic equestrians of Spain
Equestrians at the 1956 Summer Olympics